Histidine triad nucleotide-binding protein 1 also known as adenosine 5'-monophosphoramidase is an enzyme that in humans is encoded by the HINT1 gene.

HINT1 hydrolyzes purine nucleotide phosphoramidates with a single phosphate group. In addition, functions as scaffolding protein that modulates transcriptional activation.

It is a haploinsufficient tumor suppressor gene that inhibits the Wnt/β-catenin pathway in colon cancer cells and microphthalmia-associated transcription factor (MITF) activity in human mast cells. In the LysRS-Ap4A-MITF signaling pathway, HINT1 inhibits the MITF transcriptional activity by direct association. Upon pathway activation, HINT1 is released from MITF by diadenosine tetraphosphate (Ap4A), produced by LysRS.

See also
 Histidine triad nucleotide-binding protein 2 (HINT2)

References

Further reading